The Northrop Grumman RQ-180 is an American stealth unmanned aerial vehicle (UAV) surveillance aircraft intended for contested airspace. , there had been no images or statements released, but growing evidence points to the existence of the RQ-180 and its use in regular front-line service.

Development
After the retirement of the SR-71 Blackbird in 1999, the US Air Force lacked an intelligence platform capable of penetrating airspace guarded by advanced air defense systems. The RQ-180 was designed to fulfill the mission previously accomplished by the high-speed SR-71.

The RQ-180 appears to be a follow-on to the Joint Unmanned Combat Air Systems project which was cancelled in late 2005 when the United States Navy (USN) wanted a carrier-based aircraft (which led to the UCAS-D) while the United States Air Force (USAF) wanted a larger, long-range global strike platform. In December 2005, the program was split in two, with the USN starting the UCAS-D program which created the Northrop Grumman X-47B, and the USAF starting a "classified program." The program was unmasked in Aviation Week & Space Technology in a December 9, 2013 cover story following several months of research.

The RQ-180 was secretly funded through the USAF's classified budget. Northrop Grumman was given the task to build the aircraft after a competition in which it defeated Boeing and Lockheed Martin. Northrop Grumman is believed to have been awarded a development contract for the RQ-180 in 2008, with deliveries of low-rate production aircraft beginning in 2013. The RQ-180 may also be related to the expansion of Northrop Grumman's production facility at United States Air Force Plant 42 in Palmdale, California.

According to Aviation Week, the secret development of the RQ-180 explains public statements of USAF officials calling for penetrating Intelligence, surveillance and reconnaissance (ISR) capabilities with no public acknowledgement of an effort to create one. It may explain the service's lack of commitment for the RQ-4 Global Hawk and instead favoring of higher priority "classified platforms". The USAF also does not want to buy and maintain large numbers of MQ-1 Predator and MQ-9 Reaper systems in order to have an aircraft that would have the ability to penetrate denied airspace and persistently provide ISR coverage. The RQ-180 may also be responsible for the termination of the Next-Generation Bomber program in 2009 from costs, and the emergence of the follow-on Long Range Strike Bomber (LRS-B) program that would be cheaper and work with the UAV. The USAF MQ-X program that was to find a platform to replace the Reaper may have been cancelled in 2012 because of the RQ-180.

Creation of the RQ-180 is believed to be related to the LRS-B program, which will have a new strategic bomber operate with a "family of systems" including a Long Range Stand Off Weapon, conventional Prompt Global Strike missiles, and electronic attack and ISR platforms; the RQ-180 would appear to fill the electronic attack and ISR roles. On October 27, 2015, the LRS-B development contract was also awarded to Northrop Grumman.

Lockheed Martin is developing its own solution to the problem of operating an ISR in defended airspace, known as the SR-72, that relies on flying at hypersonic speeds. Northrop Grumman's stealth design was seen as less susceptible to acquisition problems and risky technologies and could be put into service sooner, as soon as 2015. A hypersonic reconnaissance aircraft would have inferior stealth features due to heat stress on radar absorbent materials and would thus be detected earlier. Moving targets could change position before the SR-72 could reach them.

The existence of the aircraft was confirmed with the briefest of details by an Air Force surveillance chief during an aerospace industry event in 2014.

In November 2020 the first photograph emerged of what is believed to be the RQ-180. The aircraft was spotted flying at high altitude over Edwards Air Force Base.  In September 2021, a second photo emerged, depicting the aircraft high over the Philippines.  Some observers noted that the aircraft in the photos is similar in appearance to the Lockheed Martin P-175 Polecat.

Design
The RQ-180 addresses a need for conducting penetrating ISR missions into defended airspace, a mission that was left unattended with the retirement of the Lockheed SR-71 Blackbird in 1999. It is equipped with an AESA radar and passive electronic surveillance measures, and may be capable of conducting electronic attack missions. The RQ-180 shows a shift from UAVs that operate in permissive environments, such as the RQ-4 Global Hawk and MQ-9 Reaper, to ones that can perform missions in contested airspace. It is larger, stealthier, and has a longer range than the RQ-170 Sentinel which has previously been used for those types of missions. The RQ-180 is believed to be about the size of the Global Hawk, which weighs , and have similar capabilities of endurance (24 hours) and range. This is much more than the RQ-170's endurance of 5–6 hours. It has superior all-aspect, broadband radar cross-section reduction features compared to previous stealth aircraft such as the F-117 Nighthawk, F-22 Raptor and F-35 Lightning II. The airframe has superior aerodynamics to give better range, endurance, and service ceiling.

Northrop Grumman claims the wing is more scalable and adaptable than the B-2 Spirit's flying wing shape. Aviation Week constructed concept images, including one on the cover of the magazine, of the stealthy unmanned aircraft that can penetrate an adversary's state-of-the-art air defenses to conduct intelligence, surveillance or reconnaissance missions. Edwards Air Force Base personnel have reportedly nicknamed the RQ-180 the "Great White Bat" and "Shikaka".

Other commentators believe the RQ-180 can function as an advanced communications relay node, integrating a suite of next-generation datalink technologies including those of the B-2, B-21, F-22, and F-35.

Specifications

See also

References

External links
 Aviation Week release 
 Aviation Week's "The Road to Stealth UAS" 

RQ-180
2010s United States military reconnaissance aircraft
Northrup Grumman RQ-180
Single-engined jet aircraft
Blended wing body
Signals intelligence
Unmanned stealth aircraft